Ballyscullion is a small village and civil parish in County Londonderry, Northern Ireland. In the 2001 Census it had a population of 291 people. The civil parish of Ballyscullion covers areas of County Antrim as well as County Londonderry. The village is situated within Mid-Ulster District.

People
Increase Mather served as a minister at St. Tida's Church, Ballyscullion in the late 1650s until 1659. Frederick Hervey, 4th Earl of Bristol, known as "The Earl-Bishop", was Bishop of Cloyne from 1767 to 1768, and as Bishop of Derry from 1768 to 1803. He built Downhill House and Ballyscullion House, residences which he adorned with rare works of art.

See also
List of villages in Northern Ireland
List of towns in Northern Ireland
List of civil parishes of County Londonderry
List of civil parishes in County Antrim

References

External links
 Profile, NI Neighbourhood Information System
 Profile,  DiCamillo Companion to British & Irish Country Houses

Villages in County Londonderry
Civil parishes of County Antrim
Civil parishes of County Londonderry
Mid-Ulster District